William Peter Wright (8 May 1903 – October 1983) was an English football player and manager, best remembered for his long association with Leyton Orient, whom he served as a player, manager, trainer and masseur.

Career statistics

References

External links 

 

English Football League players
English footballers
Association football wing halves
People from Southwark
1903 births
1983 deaths
Leyton Orient F.C. players
Leyton Orient F.C. managers
English Football League managers
English football managers